Cornish is an unincorporated community in Weld County, in the U.S. state of Colorado.

History
A post office called Cornish was established in 1914, and remained in operation until 1967. The community was named after a Mr. Cornish, an engineer employed by the Union Pacific Railroad.

A railway was built through Cornish sometime in the early 1900s, as part of a line from Greeley to Briggsdale. The Union Pacific Railroad filed for the abandonment of the line in 1942, with the actual abandonment occurring in 1946.

References

Unincorporated communities in Weld County, Colorado
Unincorporated communities in Colorado